Daniel K. Riskin is a Canadian evolutionary biologist, television personality and producer. He hosted the Canadian television series Daily Planet.

Early life and education
He was born and raised in Edmonton, Alberta and currently lives in Toronto, Ontario. He received a BSc in zoology from the University of Alberta, an MSc in biology from York University, and a PhD in zoology from Cornell University. He also completed post-doctoral studies at Boston University and Brown University.

Career

Science
During high school, Riskin read a book called Just Bats by M. Brock Fenton. The book inspired him, so he contacted Fenton, then a professor at York University, and told him that he would like to meet him. Fenton invited him to come out to join his lab. Within a few months, Riskin was catching bats in Costa Rica.

Riskin has studied bats in Costa Rica, United States, Canada, Anguilla, France, Israel, Australia, New Zealand, Trinidad, Ecuador, South Africa and Madagascar and has filmed in United States, Morocco, England, China and Germany. He has authored or co-authored more than 20 papers.

After publishing a scientific paper about running vampire bats in 2005, Riskin was interviewed on Discovery Canada's flagship daily science show, Daily Planet, by then-host Natasha Stillwell. Years later, Riskin joined the show as the replacement for long-time host Jay Ingram.

Television
Riskin appears on the Animal Planet series Monsters Inside Me, which is about parasites, as an expert.

To promote that show, Riskin has appeared on The Dr. Oz Show (2009), The Tonight Show with Jay Leno (2010), and several times on The Late Late Show with Craig Ferguson (2010–2014). Riskin has also appeared on the shows Evolve (2008) and Bedbug Apocalypse (2011). In 2010, Riskin became the co-host of Daily Planet, on Discovery Channel Canada with Ziya Tong.

Although Riskin now works full-time in television, he still dabbles in bat research. On one of his first segments on Daily Planet, he filmed in China to look for the fishing bat which catches fish with its feet.

Writing
Riskin's first book, Mother Nature is Trying to Kill You: A Lively Tour Through the Dark Side of the Natural World, was published by Touchstone Books on March 4, 2014.

Television appearances
 Evolve – Expert (2008)
 Monsters Inside Me – Expert (2009–2017)
 Bedbug Apocalypse – Expert (2011)
 Human Nature – Host (2012)
 Daily Planet – Co-Host (2011–2018)
 Battle of the Alphas - Expert (2021-2022)

References

External links
 
 
 
 Daily Planet Co-Host Bio: Dan Riskin

Living people
Cornell University alumni
People from Edmonton
1975 births
Canadian biologists
Evolutionary biologists
University of Alberta alumni
York University alumni